Brandon Bailey (5 November 1932 – 9 October 2013) was a Trinidad and Tobago weightlifter. He competed in the men's heavyweight event at the 1964 Summer Olympics.

References

1932 births
2013 deaths
Trinidad and Tobago male weightlifters
Olympic weightlifters of Trinidad and Tobago
Weightlifters at the 1964 Summer Olympics
Place of birth missing
Commonwealth Games medallists in weightlifting
Commonwealth Games bronze medallists for Trinidad and Tobago
Pan American Games medalists in weightlifting
Pan American Games silver medalists for Trinidad and Tobago
Pan American Games bronze medalists for Trinidad and Tobago
Weightlifters at the 1963 Pan American Games
Weightlifters at the 1962 British Empire and Commonwealth Games
Weightlifters at the 1966 British Empire and Commonwealth Games
Medallists at the 1962 British Empire and Commonwealth Games
Medallists at the 1966 British Empire and Commonwealth Games